Andisiwe Mgcoyi (born 16 June 1988) is a South African soccer player who plays as a forward for Mitrovica. She represented the South Africa women's national soccer team at the 2012 London Olympics.

Career

Club
Mgcoyi played for Mamelodi Sundowns in the Sasol League in South Africa. She joined Nové Zámky during the 2012/2013 season and immediately became an overnight sensation, scoring 13 goals in 10 matches to finish as the club's second top goalscorer and also helping the club win their first Slovak Women's First League title. She also represented her club in the UEFA Women's Champions League qualifying round and as of 12 August 2013 she had 1 goal in 3 matches. After leaving Nové Zámky, Mgcoyi has had a spell with Hungarian team Dorogi Diófa, a return to Mamelodi Sundowns and, most recently, a loan to German side 1. FC Saarbrücken.

International
Mgcoyi was also instrumental in South Africa's quest to win the 2012 African Women's Championship after finishing runners up in 2006 and 2008. She was the spearhead of the team as she scored a hat trick against DR Congo winning 4-1 but the team lost to Equatorial Guinea in the final.

References

Living people
1988 births
Women's association football forwards
South African women's soccer players
South Africa women's international soccer players
Footballers at the 2012 Summer Olympics
Olympic soccer players of South Africa
South African expatriate soccer players
South African expatriate sportspeople in Slovakia
Expatriate women's footballers in Slovakia
FK Union Nové Zámky players
1. FC Saarbrücken (women) players
Slovak Women's First League players
2. Frauen-Bundesliga players
Sportspeople from Johannesburg
KFF Mitrovica players